Mark "Flash" Dudbridge (born 11 January 1973) is an English professional darts player. He appeared in the 2005 Premier League Darts after reaching the final of the 2005 PDC World Darts Championship. He also is a former World Master and has reached the final of the World Matchplay.

Career
Dudbridge started playing in his very early teens, citing Dennis Priestley as one of his heroes. Dudbridge made a name for himself in the British Darts Organisation by winning the Winmau World Masters in 2002, defeating Tony West in the final – in his first televised tournament. He never competed in the BDO version of the World Championship and switched instead to compete in the Professional Darts Corporation.

In 2003, he won a regional final of the UK Open and also the Ireland Open Classic and knocked out John Part, who was defending champion at the time, in his first appearance at the World Championship in 2004. His success continued in Blackpool at the World Matchplay in 2004 going on to reach the final before losing to Phil Taylor. His 2005 PDC World Championship campaign started off by beating two former World Champions back to back – Richie Burnett and then John Part. He then beat Denis Ovens and Wayne Mardle before meeting Taylor again in the final – possibly Dudbridge's best achievement to date. This achievement saw him qualify for the inaugural Premier League and he also took the decision to become a full-time professional player.

Since 2005, Dudbridge's ranking has slipped and he has not made the major impact on the game that his earlier results might have suggested. He started 2007 ranked 20 in the world rankings and his best result of that year was reaching the quarter finals of the new US Open in May. Later in that season, in the World Grand Prix, he did however achieve what has become one of the more notable and memorable moments in the tournament's history; in his second round clash with Andy Jenkins, with the match going into a deciding leg, he missed his first 9 darts at the double-in, and his opponent took a 285 point lead - Dudbridge however managed to produce some heavy scoring in his next visits and won the leg and match. 

Dudbridge qualified for the 2013 UK Open, his first televised appearance since the 2012 PDC World Championship. He also qualified for the 2014 World Championship. In 2017, he won two Challenge Tour events. He earned a Pro Tour Card for 2018 by finishing second in the Challenge Tour Order of Merit.

Outside darts
Dudbridge is one of the few players chosen to appear in the PDC World Championship Darts computer game.

Dudbridge owns Cafe501 and Solar Darts. He currently lives in Bradley Stoke and is married with three children. He is a supporter of Bristol City and several players including Scott Murray and Louis Carey have been spotted watching his matches live.

World Championship results

PDC
2004: Quarter-finals (lost to Kevin Painter 1–5)
2005: Runner-up (lost to Phil Taylor 4–7)
2006: Third round (lost to Kevin Painter 1–4)
2007: Second round (lost to Andy Hamilton 3–4)
2008: Third round (lost to James Wade 2–4)
2009: Third round (lost to Barrie Bates 0–4)
2010: Third round (lost to Co Stompé 2–4)
2011: Second round (lost to Adrian Lewis 1–4)
2012: First round (lost to Dave Chisnall 0–3)
2014: First round (lost to Gary Anderson 0–3)

WSDT
2023: Quarter-finals (lost to Kevin Painter 1–3)

Career finals

BDO major finals: 1 (1 title)

PDC premier event finals: 2 (2 runners-up)

Performance timeline

References

External links

1973 births
Living people
English darts players
Professional Darts Corporation former tour card holders
British Darts Organisation players
PDC ranking title winners
21st-century English people